Events in the year 1490 in Japan.

Incumbents
Monarch: Go-Tsuchimikado

Deaths
January 27 - Ashikaga Yoshimasa (b. 1435), shōgun

 
 
Japan
Years of the 15th century in Japan